Young-mi, also spelled Yong-mi or Yeong-mi, is a Korean feminine given name. It was the tenth-most popular name for baby girls born in South Korea in 1960.

Hanja
The meaning of the name Young-mi depends on the hanja used to write each syllable of the name. There are 34 hanja with the reading "young" and 33 hanja with the reading "mi" on the South Korean government's official list of hanja which may be registered for use in given names. Some ways of writing this name in hanja include:
:  ggotburi yeong meaning "flower petals" or ddwieonal yeong meaning "heroic"; areumdaul mi meaning "beautiful". These characters are also used to write the Japanese given name Hidemi.
: yeonghwa yeong meaning "flourishing"; areumdaul mi meaning "beautiful". These characters are also used to write the Japanese given name Emi.

People
People with this name include:

Youngmi Kim (born 1954), South Korean soprano singer
Kim Young-mi (sport shooter) (born 1960), South Korean sport shooter
Choi Young-mi (born 1961), South Korean poet
Kolleen Park (Korean name Park Youngmi, born 1967), American musician and actress active in the South Korean entertainment industry
Hong Yeong-mi (born 1968), South Korean cyclist
Ahn Young-mi (born 1983), South Korean comedian
Kang Young-mi (born 1985), South Korean fencer
Kim Yong-mi (synchronized swimmer) (born 1989), North Korean synchronized swimmer
Kim Yeong-mi (born 1991), South Korean curler
Kim Yong-mi (volleyball) (born 1992), North Korean volleyball player
Youngmi Mayer, American comedian

See also
List of Korean given names

References

Korean feminine given names